Events from the year 1847 in Sweden

Incumbents
 Monarch – Oscar I

Events
 18 January – Brottslingarne by Emelie Flygare Carlén on Mindre teatern in Stockholm.
 24 May – Hittebarnet by August Blanche on Djurgårdsteatern in Stockholm.
 13 December – Mor och döttrar eller Namnförvexlingen by Jeanette Stjernström in Mindre teatern in Stockholm.
 Jenny Lind returns to Sweden with a great tour. 
 The first bureau for registration as medical examination of prostitutes is opened in the capital: from 1859, all prostitutes are forced to registration. 
 Poor Care Regulation of 1847 replace the Beggar Regulation of 1642 and reorganize the poor relief system. Rotegång is banned for children. 
 The Åhlinska skolan is founded in Stockholm by Karin Åhlin and her sisters.
 Aurore Storckenfeldt open the Storckenfeldtska skolan.
 Slavery is abolished on the Swedish colony of Saint Barthélemy.
 The perfume and cosmetic company Antoinette W Nording is founded by Antoinette Nording.
 - 1846 och 1946 by August Blanche
 - Barnen i nya skogen by Frederick Marryat.
 - De begge aristokraterna by Wilhelmina Stålberg
 - Flickan i Stadsträdgården by August Blanche
 - Herr Dardanell och hans upptåg på landet by August Blanche
 - Stockholm, Westerås och Upsala by August Blanche
 - Tegnérs minne by August Blanche
 - Vålnaden by August Blanche

Births
 1 May – Hildegard Björck, first Swedish woman to complete an academic degree (died 1920) 
 12 June – Hulda Lundin, tailor and educator (died 1921)
 14 August – Karl Oskar Medin, paediatrician (died 1927)
 20 October – Oscar Swahn, shooter   (died 1927)
 Anna Rönström, educator and mathematician  (died 1920)
 Sophie Cysch, singer (died 1917)

Deaths
 9 February - Ulrica Eleonora Rålamb, politically active countess and spy (born 1769)
 17 April - Maria Franck, actress   (born 1769) 
 23 April – Erik Gustaf Geijer,  historian, poet, philosopher, and composer  (born 1783) 
 18 June  - Lisette Stenberg, actress and pianist (born 1770) 
 14 August – Frans Michael Franzén, writer  (born 1772) 
 25 December – Carl Gustaf von Brinkman, diplomat  (born 1764) 
 - Amelie von Strussenfelt, writer  (born 1803)

References

 
Years of the 19th century in Sweden